Ṣafīyyah bint Ḥuyayy was the tenth wife of Muhammad. She was, along with all other wives of Muhammad, titled Umm-ul-Mu'mineen or the "Mother of Believers".

Early life
Safiyyah was born in Medina to Huyayy ibn Akhtab, the chief of the Jewish tribe Banu Nadir. Her mother, Barrah bint Samawal, was from the Banu Qurayza tribe. Her maternal grandfather was Samaw'al ibn 'Adiya, a celebrated pre-Islamic Arabian Jewish poet from the Banu Harith tribe. According to a source, she was married off to Sallam ibn Mishkam, who later divorced her.

When the Banu Nadir were expelled from Medina in 625, her family settled in Khaybar, an oasis near Medina. Her father and brother went from Khaybar to join the Meccan and Bedouin forces besieging Muhammad in Medina during the Battle of the Trench. When the Meccans withdrew Muhammad besieged the Banu Qurayza. After the defeat of the Banu Qurayza in 627 Safiyya's father, a long-time opponent of Muhammad, was captured and executed by the Muslims.

In 627 or early in 628, Safiyya was married to Kenana ibn al-Rabi, treasurer of the Banu Nadir; she was about 17 years old at that time. According to Muslim sources, Safiyya is said to have informed Kenana of a dream she had in which the moon had fallen from the heavens into her lap. Kenana interpreted it as a desire to marry Muhammad and struck her in the face, leaving a mark which was still visible when she first had contact with Muhammad.

Battle of Khaybar

In May 628 CE, the Muslims defeated several Jewish tribes (including the Banu Nadir) at the Battle of Khaybar. The Jews had surrendered, and were allowed to remain in Khaybar on the provision that they give half of their annual produce to the Muslims. The land itself became the property of the Muslim state. This agreement, Stillman says, did not extend to the Banu Nadir tribe, who were given no quarters. Safiyya's then husband, Kenana ibn al-Rabi'a, was in duty of maintaining their fort in Khaybar, which was eventfully besieged and he was executed by the muslims.

Marriage to Muhammad
According to Muhammad al-Bukhari, Muhammad stayed for three days between Khaybar and Medina, where he consummated his marriage to Safiyya. His companions wondered if she was to be considered a captive or a wife. The former speculated that they would consider Safiyya as Muhammad's wife, and thus "Mother of the Believers".

Muhammad advised Safiyya to convert to Islam, she accepted and agreed to became Muhammad's wife. Safiyya did not bear any children to Muhammad.

Regarding Safiyya's Jewish descent, Muhammad once said to his wife that if other women insulted her for her "Jewish heritage" and were jealous because of her beauty, she was to respond,

"My father (ancestor) Harun (Aaron) was a prophet, my uncle (his brother) Musa (Moses) was a prophet, and my husband (Muhammad) is a prophet."

Legacy
After Muhammad's death, she became involved in the power politics of the early Muslim community, and acquired substantial influence by the time of her death.
In 656, Safiyya sided with caliph Uthman ibn Affan, and defended him at his last meeting with Ali, Aisha, and Abd Allah ibn al-Zubayr. During the period when the caliph was besieged at his residence, Safiyya made an unsuccessful attempt to reach him, and supplied him with food and water via a plank placed between her dwelling and his.

Safiyya died in 670 or 672, during the reign of Muawiyah I, and was buried in the Jannat al-Baqi graveyard. She left an estate of 100,000 dirhams in land and goods, one-third of which she bequeathed to her sister's son, who followed Judaism. Her dwelling in Medina was bought by Muawiyya for 180,000 dirhams.

Her dream was interpreted as a miracle, and her suffering and reputation for crying won her a place in Sufi works. She is mentioned in all major books of hadith for relating a few traditions and a number of events in her life serve as legal precedents.

See also

 Saffiyah (name)
 Rayhana bint Zayd
 Judaism's views on Muhammad
 List of non-Arab Sahaba

References and footnotes

Bibliography

Further reading
 Awde, Nicholas Women in Islam: An Anthology from the Qur'an and Hadits, Routledge (UK) 2000, 
 John Esposito and Yvonne Yazbeck Haddad, Islam, Gender, and Social Change, Oxford University Press, 1997, 
 Leila Ahmed, Women and Gender in Islam: Historical roots of a modern debate, Yale University Press, 1992
 Valentine Moghadam (ed), Gender and National Identity.
Karen Armstrong, "The Battle for God: Fundamentalism in Judaism, Christianity and Islam", London, HarperCollins/Routledge, 2001

601 births
661 deaths
Banu Nadir
Converts to Islam from Judaism
Women companions of the Prophet
Muslim saints
Jewish Saudi Arabian history
7th-century Arabian Jews
Islam and Judaism
Wives of Muhammad
Women in medieval warfare
Women in war in the Middle East
Burials at Jannat al-Baqī